Sissel Knutsen Hegdal (born 20 November 1965) is a Norwegian politician for the Conservative Party.

She served as a deputy representative to the Parliament of Norway from Rogaland during the terms 2009–2013 and 2013–2017. She is a lawyer by profession and has been a member of Stavanger city council since 2007.

References

1965 births
Living people
Deputy members of the Storting
Conservative Party (Norway) politicians
Politicians from Stavanger
Women members of the Storting
Norwegian women lawyers
Place of birth missing (living people)
20th-century Norwegian lawyers